Nocticolidae is a small family in the order Blattodea (cockroaches). It consists of only 32 known species in 9 genera. They are found in Africa, Asia and Australia. Most live in cave habitats, although a few are associated with termites. Cave adapted species are known from the Cenomanian aged Burmese amber, making them the oldest extant cavernicolous organisms.

Genera
The family includes the following genera:

 Alluaudellina Chopard, 1932
 Cardacopsis Karny, 1924
 Cardacus Strand, 1928
 Metanocticola Roth, 1999
 Nocticola Bolívar, 1892
 Pholeosilpha Chopard, 1958
 Spelaeoblatta Bolívar, 1897
 Typhloblatta Chopard, 1924
 Typhloblattodes Chopard, 1946
Crenocticola Li and Huang, 2019 Burmese amber, Cenomanian
Mulleriblattina Sendi et al, 2020 Burmese amber, Cenomanian

References

 Blattodea Species File: Nocticolidae

Cockroach families